Toram  may refer to:

 Toram language, an Afro-Asiatic language spoken in central Chad
 Toram, a boot parameter for Linux distributions that run from RAM